Hydrofluoroolefins (HFOs) are unsaturated organic compounds composed of hydrogen, fluorine and carbon. These organofluorine compound are of interest as refrigerants. Unlike traditional hydrofluorocarbons (HFCs) and chlorofluorocarbons (CFCs), which are saturated, HFOs are olefins, otherwise known as alkenes.

HFO refrigerants are categorized as having zero ozone depletion potential (ODP) and low global warming potential (GWP) and so offer a more environmentally friendly alternative to CFC, HCFC, and HFC refrigerants. Compared to HCFCs and HFCs, HFOs have shorter tropospheric lifetimes due to the reactivity of the C=C bond with hydroxyl radicals and chlorine radicals. This quick reactivity prevents them from reaching the stratosphere and participating in the depletion of good ozone, leading to strong interest in the development and characterization of new HFO blends for use as refrigerants. Many refrigerants in the HFO class are inherently stable chemically and inert, non toxic, and non-flammable or mildly flammable. Many HFOs have the proper freezing and boiling points to be useful for refrigeration at common temperatures. They have also been adopted as blowing agents, i.e. in production of insulation foams, food industry, construction materials, and others.

HFOs are being developed as "fourth generation" refrigerants with 0.1% of the GWP of HFCs.

Examples 
HFOs in use include:

 2,3,3,3-tetrafluoropropene (HFO-1234yf, trademarked as Opteon YF) and 1,3,3,3-tetrafluoropropene (HFO-1234ze).
 cis-1,1,1,4,4,4-hexafluoro-2-butene (HFO-1336mzz-Z; DR-2) shows also a promise in high temperature applications like cogeneration, heat recovery and medium temperature heat pumps.
 trans-1,1,1,4,4,4-hexafluoro-2-butene (HFO-1336mzz-E) also has good properties, and is being investigated. (developments led by Dr Kostas Kontomaris, from DuPont Flurochemicals; multiple publications in 2012-2019 and dozens of related patents).

The largest brand of HFOs is Opteon, produced by Chemours (a DuPont spin-off).

See also
 List of refrigerants

References

Haloalkenes
Organofluorides
Refrigerants